Zela is an Indomalayan genus of grass skippers.

Species
Zela cowani Evans, [1939] Peninsula Malaya
Zela elioti Evans, [1939] Thailand, Langkawi, Malaysia, Tioman
Zela excellens (Staudinger, 1889) Thailand, Langkawi, Malaysia, Borneo, Sumatra, Siberut, Palawan
Zela onara (Butler, 1870) Thailand, Malaysia, Borneo, Sumatra, Java
Zela smaragdinus (H. H. Druce, 1912) Thailand, Langkawi, Malaysia, Borneo
Zela zenon (de Nicéville, 1895) Borneo
Zela zero Evans, 1932
Zela zeta Devyatkin, 2007
Zela zeus de Nicéville, 1895 Assam to Malaya, Burma, Philippines, Thailand, Langkawi

Biology 
The larvae feed on  Palmae including Calamus

References

 , 2007: Hesperiidae of Vietnam, 16. A new species and a new record of the Hesperiidae from Central Vietnam, with a revisional note on the genus Hidari Distant, 1886 (Lepidoptera: Hesperiidae). Atalanta 38 (3-4): 347-349.
Zela de Nicéville, 1895 at Markku Savela's ''Lepidoptera and Some Other Life Forms

Erionotini
Hesperiidae genera